This was the eleventh season for the rugby league League Cup, which was once again known as the John Player Trophy for sponsorship reasons.

Hull F.C. won the trophy, beating derby rivals Hull Kingston Rovers by the score of 12-4 in the final, which was played at Headingley, Leeds, West Yorkshire. The attendance was 25,245 and receipts were £42987.

Background 
This season saw two change in the  entrants. With the  entry of Cardiff City and Carlisle into the league and also this competition, no junior team was invited, and the number of entrants increased to thirty-three
To cater for the odd number, a Preliminary Round consisting of just one single match was introduced.

Competition and results

Preliminary round 
Involved  1 match and 2 Clubs

Round 1 - First  Round 

Involved  16 matches and 32 Clubs

Round 1 - First  Round Replays 
Involved 1 match and 2 Clubs

Round 2 - Second  Round 

Involved  8 matches and 16 Clubs

Round 3 -Quarter Finals 

Involved 4 matches with 8 clubs

Round 4 – Semi-Finals 

Involved 2 matches and 4 Clubs

Final

Teams and scorers 

Scoring - Try = three points - Goal = two points - Drop goal = one point

Prize money 
As part of the sponsorship deal and funds, the  prize money awarded to the competing teams for this season is as follows :-

Note - the  author is unable to trace the award amounts for this season. Can anyone help ?

The road to success 
This tree excludes any preliminary round fixtures

Notes and comments 
1 * RUGBYLEAGUEproject gives the attendance as 957, but the Huddersfield Yearbook 1981 gives the attendance for this match as 931
2 * Wigan official archives give the score as 12-10 (obviously incorrect as Hull proceeded to the Semi-finals) but RUGBYLEAGUEproject gives it as 12-14
3 * Wigan official archives give the score as 0-8 but RUGBYLEAGUEproject gives it as 0-6
4 * RUGBYLEAGUEproject gives the attendance as 25,165 but Rothman's Yearbooks  1990-91  and 1991-92 give it as 25,245
5 * The attendance was a new record for the final, easily beating last years previous record of 12,820
6  * Headingley, Leeds, is the home ground of Leeds RLFC with a capacity of 21,000. The record attendance was  40,175 for a league match between Leeds and Bradford Northern on 21 May 1947.

General information for those unfamiliar 
The council of the Rugby Football League voted to introduce a new competition, to be similar to The Football Association and Scottish Football Association's "League Cup". It was to be a similar knock-out structure to, and to be secondary to, the Challenge Cup. As this was being formulated, sports sponsorship was becoming more prevalent and as a result John Player and Sons, a division of Imperial Tobacco Company, became sponsors, and the competition never became widely known as the "League Cup" 
The competition ran from 1971-72 until 1995-96 and was initially intended for the professional clubs plus the two amateur BARLA National Cup finalists. In later seasons the entries were expanded to take in other amateur and French teams. The competition was dropped due to "fixture congestion" when Rugby League became a summer sport
The Rugby League season always (until the onset of "Summer Rugby" in 1996) ran from around August-time through to around May-time and this competition always took place early in the season, in the Autumn, with the final usually taking place in late January 
The competition was variably known, by its sponsorship name, as the Player's No.6 Trophy (1971–1977), the John Player Trophy (1977–1983), the John Player Special Trophy (1983–1989), and the Regal Trophy in 1989.

See also 
1981–82 Rugby Football League season
1981 Lancashire Cup
1981 Yorkshire Cup
John Player Trophy
Rugby league county cups

References

External links
Saints Heritage Society
1896–97 Northern Rugby Football Union season at wigan.rlfans.com 
Hull&Proud Fixtures & Results 1896/1897
Widnes Vikings - One team, one passion Season In Review - 1896-97
The Northern Union at warringtonwolves.org
Huddersfield R L Heritage
Wakefield until I die

1981 in English rugby league
1982 in English rugby league
League Cup (rugby league)